Euchalcia emichi is a moth of the family Noctuidae. It is widespread in Turkey, Armenia, Iran, Azerbaijan and Iraq. In the Levant  it has been recorded from Syria, Lebanon  and Israel.

Adults are on wing from May to July. There is one generation per year. The larvae had been recorded in Turkey on a yellow flowered Nonea sp.
(Boraginaceae).

References

External links
Plusiinae of Israel

Plusiinae
Moths of Europe
Moths of Asia
Moths of the Middle East